"You're in Love" is a song by American pop rock band Wilson Phillips. It was the fourth single released from the group's self-titled debut album (1990) and reached number one on the US Billboard Hot 100, becoming the group's 4th and final top ten hit in the United States. With this single, the group received a nomination at the 34th Annual Grammy Awards in the Best Pop Vocal Performance by a Duo or Group category, losing to R.E.M.'s "Losing My Religion".

Chart performance
"You're in Love" reached number one on the Billboard Hot 100 for the week ending April 20, 1991; it was their third number-one hit and fourth top-five single. It also spent four weeks atop the adult contemporary chart in 1991, the group's longest stay at number on this chart (both "Hold On" and "Release Me" reached number one on the AC chart for one week each). In Canada, the song reached number three on the RPM Top Singles chart and also became an adult contemporary number-one hit, spending two weeks atop the RPM Adult Contemporary chart. Outside North America, the single failed the replicate the success of the band's previous singles, reaching number 29 on the UK Singles Chart and missing the top 30 in both Belgium and the Netherlands.

Track listings

US maxi-CD single
 "You're in Love" (radio edit) – 3:59
 "You're in Love" – 4:35
 "Hold On" (live in Japan) – 4:43
 "Release Me" (live in Japan) – 4:38
 "Morning Tea in Tokyo: A Conversation with Wilson Phillips" – 1:46

US cassette single
 "You're in Love" (radio edit) – 3:59
 "Hold On" (live in Japan) – 4:43
 "Release Me" (live in Japan) – 4:38
 "Morning Tea in Tokyo: A Conversation with Wilson Phillips" – 1:46

UK cassette single
 "You're in Love" (radio edit) – 3:59	
 "Hold On" (live in Japan) – 4:43

UK CD single
 "You're in Love" (radio edit) – 3:59	
 "Hold On" (live in Japan) – 4:43
 "Release Me" (live in Japan) – 4:38
 "You're in Love" (album remix) – 4:35

European 12-inch single
A1. "You're in Love" (album remix) – 4:34
B1. "Hold On" (live in Japan) – 4:42
B2. "Release Me" (live in Japan) – 4:36

Japanese mini-CD single
 "You're in Love"
 "Ooh You're Gold"

Charts

Weekly charts

Year-end charts

Release history

References

Wilson Phillips songs
1990 songs
1991 singles
Billboard Hot 100 number-one singles
Pop ballads
SBK Records singles
Song recordings produced by Glen Ballard
Songs written by Glen Ballard
Torch songs